Carl Ludwig Matthes (born 1751) was a German oboist and composer of the classical era.

Life
Matthes was born in Berlin, where his father was a musician. He learned the oboe from Carlo Besozzi in Dresden and after this time, he "blew the oboe with great skill and an pleasant tone". He was also noted for his excellent performance of slow movements, which he played "with taste, sensitivity and pleasant tone, after the latest fashion". As an oboist, he was compared to Johann Christian Fischer, Ludwig August Lebrun and his teacher, Besozzi.

In 1781, he became an oboist and Kammermusikus at the Hofkapelle of Margrave Friedrich Heinrich von Schwedt in Berlin. During this time, he composed Urania's Weissagung, which was performed on the birthday of King Friedrich Wilhelm II at the Margravial theater in Schwedt in 1786. In 1788, following the death of the Margrave and the subsequent dissolution of the Hofkapelle, Matthes took over a starch factory. As he had no experience running a business, he soon landed in debt and filed for bankruptcy. After this, he returned to music, but there are no surviving records of his life after this date.

Works
Matthes' only surviving works are two sonatas for oboe and continuo which were published by Carl Philipp Emmanuel Bach in 1770 as part of Musikalisches Vielerley. The sonatas survive in numerous manuscript copies which attests to their popularity. They were also reworked for flute and continuo.

References

External links

1751 births
Musicians from Berlin
18th-century German people
German male classical composers
German Classical-period composers
German classical oboists
Male oboists
18th-century classical composers
Year of death missing
18th-century German composers
18th-century German male musicians
19th-century German male musicians